Mabel Geraldine Woodruffe Peacock (9 May 1856– 17 July 1920) was an English folklorist.

Peacock was the daughter of Lucy and Edward Peacock F.S.A. of Bottesford Manor, Brigg, Lincolnshire, and later of Kirton-in-Lindsey. Her brother Adrian was a noted ecologist.

She made collections of folklore in this region and published them in journals and her books.

She retired to Norfolk in 1918 and died of tuberculosis in 1920.  Mabel Peacock is buried in Grayingham, Lincolnshire churchyard.

Peacock is among the favorite authors of Sir George Bailey in A. S. Byatt's novel, Possession.

Bibliography

Her works include:
 An Index of Royalists whose estates were confiscated during the Commonwealth. 1879.
Tales and Rhymes in the Lindsey Folk-speech, 1886, with Max Peacock (anonymously)
Tales fra Linkishire, 1889. She also edited a reprint of John Bunyan's Holy War and Heavenly Footman, 1892, with full introduction and notes; 
Lincolnshire Tales, 1897. 
Lincolnshire Rhymes, 1907. 
Lincolnshire County Folklore, 1908, with Eliza Gutch. 
 Many contributions to Folk-Lore and a collection of notes and manuscript.

References

1920 deaths
English folklorists
Women folklorists
People from the Borough of North Lincolnshire
1856 births